Lynsey Baxter is an English actress. 

She was born in London on May 7, 1959. She began as a child actress in 1974, and later trained at Royal Academy of Dramatic Art (RADA). She has worked in theatre, television, film, radio and voiceover.

Baxter trained in reflexology in 1998, while appearing in the television series Dangerfield, and in her spare time worked in hospitals. She was also reported to be a trained remedial masseuse and transpersonal counsellor.

Filmography

Film

Television

Theatre

Radio
Kind Hearts and Coronets, BBC Radio (1995), as Sybella
 Abelard and Heloise, BBC Radio (1999)

Awards
 Most Promising Newcomer, Plays and Players Award
 Best Actress, Monte-Carlo Film and Television Festival 1991, as Elizabeth in ScreenPlay: Starlings  (1988).

References

External links

Alumni of RADA
English film actresses
English television actresses
Living people
Actresses from London
1959 births
20th-century English actresses
21st-century English actresses
English stage actresses